Clifford Ellsworth Randall (December 25, 1876October 16, 1934) was a U.S. Representative from Wisconsin.

Born in Troy Center, Wisconsin, Randall attended the public schools.
He was graduated from the public high school of East Troy, Wisconsin, in 1894 and from the Whitewater Normal School in 1901.
He taught school at Lake Beulah, Troy Center, and Rochester, Wisconsin.
He was graduated from the law department of the University of Wisconsin–Madison in 1906.
He was admitted to the bar the same year and commenced the practice of law in Kenosha, Wisconsin, judge of the municipal court from 1909 to 1917.

Randall was elected as a Republican to the Sixty-sixth Congress (March 4, 1919March 3, 1921) representing Wisconsin's 1st congressional district.
He was an unsuccessful candidate for renomination in 1920.
He resumed the practice of law in Kenosha, Wisconsin.

Randall was elected city attorney in 1921 and served until 1930, continued the practice of law in Kenosha, Wisconsin, until his death there of a heart attack on October 16, 1934.
He was interred in Green Ridge Cemetery.

References

External links
 

1876 births
1934 deaths
People from Troy, Walworth County, Wisconsin
Politicians from Kenosha, Wisconsin
Educators from Wisconsin
Wisconsin lawyers
Wisconsin state court judges
University of Wisconsin Law School alumni
University of Wisconsin–Whitewater alumni
Republican Party members of the United States House of Representatives from Wisconsin